Charles Richmond may refer to:

 Charles Wallace Richmond (1868–1932), American ornithologist
 Charlie Richmond (referee) (born 1968), Scottish former football referee